Rowe-Lant Farm is a historic home and farm complex located at East Chatham in Columbia County, New York.  The farmhouse was built about 1790 and is an L-shaped dwelling with a 2-story, brick main block and -story brick and frame wing.  It is five bays wide and two bays deep with a gable roof. Also on the property is a large timber-frame barn, garage and horse barn, and large tractor barn.

It was added to the National Register of Historic Places in 2010.

References

Houses on the National Register of Historic Places in New York (state)
Houses completed in 1790
Houses in Columbia County, New York
National Register of Historic Places in Columbia County, New York